"Round Here" is the first single from Memphis Bleek's third album, M.A.D.E. "Round Here" features verses from Southern rappers Trick Daddy and T.I. The song was produced by Just Blaze.  The song peaked at #53 on the Billboard Hot R&B/Hip-Hop Songs chart.

Song info and music video
The song's theme is to show that no matter where you are from everyone who lives in the hood has to struggle.
References :
Memphis Bleek
Put in game down here, make change down here
Cause I serve them fiends, that raw 'caine down here
T.I. :
You say the wrong thang, get ya back blown round here
Cause gangsta's rep they hood, by the zone round here

In the music video, each rapper portrays the gritty life in their low income neighborhoods they grew up in throughout a single day. Memphis Bleek rapping in some public housing apartments behind him in Brooklyn in the early morning, Trick Daddy raps in front of some low cost apartments, run down houses and stores in Miami in the afternoon/mid-day, and T.I. raps on the front lawn of a house in a low income neighborhood in Atlanta in the evening/dusk. The video features cameos by East Coast rapper Jay-Z and a then-unknown Rick Ross and Pitbull.

The official remix, the "Dirty South Remix", features T.I., B.G., & Big Kuntry King.

Charts

References

2003 singles
2003 songs
Memphis Bleek songs
T.I. songs
Trick Daddy songs
Roc-A-Fella Records singles
Song recordings produced by Just Blaze
Songs written by Trick Daddy
Songs written by T.I.
Gangsta rap songs